New Zealand competed at the 2020 Winter Youth Olympics in Lausanne, Switzerland, from 9 to 22 January 2020. They were represented by a team of 20 athletes, who took part in nine sports. The chef de mission was Jesse Teat. The flagbearer at the opening ceremony was biathlon athlete and cross-country skier Campbell Wright, and freestyle skier Luca Harrington was the flagbearer at the closing ceremony.

Medalists
Medals awarded to New Zealand participants in mixed-NOC team events are represented in italics. These medals do not count towards the New Zealand NOC medal tally.

Alpine skiing

Biathlon

Cross-country skiing

Curling

Mixed team

Mixed doubles

Freestyle skiing

Ice hockey

3x3

Luge

Singles

Team relay

Short track speed skating

Individual

Mixed NOC team relay

Snowboarding

See also
New Zealand at the 2020 Summer Olympics

References

2020 in New Zealand sport
Nations at the 2020 Winter Youth Olympics
New Zealand at the Youth Olympics